Marlene Rosenberg is an American plasma physicist known for her work on cosmic and interplanetary dusty plasma.

Education and career
Rosenberg earned a Ph.D. in astronomy at Harvard University in 1976, under the supervision of Gabor J. Kalman; her dissertation was Waves and instabilities in plasmas in pulsar atmospheres.

After working on nuclear fusion in industry at General Atomics and Jaycor, in San Diego, California, she became a research scientist in electrical and computer engineering at the University of California, San Diego (UCSD), in the early 1990s, affiliated with the UCSD Center for Astrophysics and Space Sciences.

Research contributions and recognition
In 2000, Rosenberg was named a Fellow of the American Physical Society (APS), after a nomination from the APS Division of Plasma Physics, "for pioneering contributions to the theory of dusty plasmas, especially related to strong coupling effects and the role of instabilities".

A 2003 paper by Rosenberg in the New Journal of Physics, "Plasma interaction with microbes" with Mounir Laroussi and D. A. Mendis, concerned "the germ-killing potential of cold plasmas"; in 2007 it was named one of the most significant articles from the journal over the previous decade.

She has also been one of the researchers on the Plasmakristall-4 (PK-4) plasma experiment, carried out beginning in 2017 on the International Space Station.

References

Year of birth missing (living people)
Living people
American physicists
American women physicists
Plasma physicists
Harvard Graduate School of Arts and Sciences alumni
Fellows of the American Physical Society
21st-century American women